Mateo Allkja (born 30 March 1998) is an Albanian professional footballer who plays as a striker for Elbasani in the Albanian Second Division.

Club career
Allkja was promoted in Elbasani's first team during the second part of 2016–17 season. He made his professional debut on 21 April 2017 in the match against Apolonia, entering in the final moments as the match ended in a 2–2 home draw. He played his first match as starter in the next league match against Turbina Cërrik which finished in a 4–1 away loss. He went on to make 2 further appearances as Elbasani was relegated after losing the relegation final 2–0 against Sopoti Librazhd.

Allkja remained at Elbasani for the 2017–18 season, now at Albanian Second Division. On 8 October 2017, in the second matchday against Albpetrol, angry with a referee decision, Allkja spat on the assistant referee and was sent off. Disciplinary Committee suspended him from playing with any Albanian club for two years. In an interview five days later, Allkja apologised for his actions, asking for Disciplinary Committee's forgiveness, recalling Armando Sadiku's similar case in 2010. On 2 December, Allkja's suspension was reduced to one year following the appeal.

Career statistics

References

External links
AFA profile

1998 births
Living people
Footballers from Elbasan
Albanian footballers
Association football forwards
KF Elbasani players
Kategoria e Dytë players
Kategoria e Parë players